Ladislav Pecko (born 27 June 1968) is a retired Slovak football player and later a football manager who was last head coach of MFK Dolný Kubín. He played 6 matches for Slovakia and spent most of career in ŠK Slovan Bratislava. His playing position was right-wing back.

Pecko made three league appearances for FK Drnovice in the Czech first division.

References

External links

1968 births
Living people
People from Čadca District
Sportspeople from the Žilina Region
Slovak footballers
Slovakia international footballers
Czechoslovak footballers
Czechoslovakia international footballers
Slovak Super Liga players
ŠK Slovan Bratislava players
Czech First League players
FK Drnovice players
Slovak football managers
Slovak Super Liga managers
ŠK Slovan Bratislava managers
1. FC Tatran Prešov managers
MFK Ružomberok managers
Dual internationalists (football)
Association football defenders